The 1956–57 Montenegrin Republic League was 12th season of Montenegrin Republic League. Due to fact that majority of Montenegrin teams played in higher ranks, League was organised as tournament.

Season 

The championship was organised as tournament of three teams - winners of regional qualifiers in which eight teams participated - Bokelj, Rudar, Gorštak, Javorak, Radnički Ivangrad, Igalo, Poštar and Zora.
Most successful teams from qualifiers were Bokelj, Rudar and Javorak, who participated in Montenegrin Republic League tournament for season 1956–57.

Table and results 
Results of the final tournament: Rudar - Javorak 1-1; Bokelj - Rudar 0-0; Javorak - Bokelj 0-3.
As a first-placed team, Bokelj gained promotion to Yugoslav Second League.

Higher leagues 
On season 1956–57, eight Montenegrin teams played in higher leagues of SFR Yugoslavia. Budućnost was a member of 1956–57 Yugoslav First League, while Nikšić, Lovćen, Arsenal, Mladost Titograd, Iskra, Jedinstvo Bijelo Polje and Jedinstvo Herceg Novi played in 1956–57 Yugoslav Second League.

See also 
 Montenegrin Republic League
Montenegrin Republic Cup (1947–2006)
Montenegrin clubs in Yugoslav football competitions (1946–2006)
Montenegrin Football Championship (1922–1940)

References 

Montenegrin Republic League